Bussac-sur-Charente (literally Bussac on Charente) is a commune in the Charente-Maritime department in the Nouvelle-Aquitaine region in southwestern France.

International relations

Bussac-sur-Charente is twinned with Oron-la-Ville, Switzerland.

Population

See also
 Communes of the Charente-Maritime department

References

External links
 

Communes of Charente-Maritime
Charente-Maritime communes articles needing translation from French Wikipedia